Augusta is a home rule-class city in Bracken County, Kentucky, in the United States. It is sited upon the southern bank of the Ohio River. As of the 2010 census, the city population was 1,190. When Bracken County was organized in 1796, Augusta was the county seat. In 1839, a new county courthouse was built at a more central location in Brooksville. The city was formally incorporated by the state assembly in 1850.

Geography
Augusta is located in northeastern Kentucky at  (38.772556, -84.001530). Kentucky Route 8 (Fifth Street) is the main road through the city. Route 8 leads northwest  to downtown Cincinnati and southeast  to Maysville. The Augusta Ferry crosses the Ohio River into Lewis Township, Brown County, Ohio, near Higginsport.

Climate
The climate in this area is characterized by hot, humid summers and generally mild to cool winters. According to the Köppen Climate Classification system, Augusta has a humid subtropical climate, abbreviated "Cfa" on climate maps.

Demographics

As of the census of 2005, there were 1,204 people, 534 households, and 330 families residing in the city. The racial makeup of the city was 97.51% White, 1.25% African American, 0.17% Pacific Islander, 0.33% from other races, and 0.75% from two or more races. Hispanic or Latino of any race were 0.58% of the population.

There were 534 households, out of which 28.8% had children under the age of 18 living with them, 43.4% were married couples living together, 14.6% had a female householder with no husband present, and 38.2% were non-families. 34.6% of all households were made up of individuals, and 14.2% had someone living alone who was 65 years of age or older. The average household size was 2.25 and the average family size was 2.88.

In the city the population was spread out, with 23.6% under the age of 18, 8.5% from 18 to 24, 27.3% from 25 to 44, 24.5% from 45 to 64, and 16.1% who were 65 years of age or older. The median age was 38 years. For every 100 females, there were 94.2 males. For every 100 females age 18 and over, there were 85.9 males.

The median income for a household in the city was $28,333, and the median income for a family was $34,167. Males had a median income of $27,500 versus $22,188 for females. The per capita income for the city was $14,450. About 15.4% of families and 16.8% of the population were below the poverty line, including 18.9% of those under age 18 and 18.5% of those age 65 or over.

History
Augusta was founded by Philip Buckner in 1786 as a trading post along the Ohio River. The city was named after Augusta County, Virginia. The city grew quickly and in 1796 became county seat of the new Bracken County.  The county seat was moved to Oxford, then back to Augusta, then finally to Brooksville in 1839.

In 1862, Confederate Colonel Basil W. Duke attacked the town as part of the Kentucky Campaign. While he was able to drive off a pair of Union gunboats in the Ohio River and defeat the local Unionist militia in house-to-house fighting, heavy losses forced him to abandon plans to cross into Ohio.

The city was home to five separate schools, one private and four public. The most famous built was the Augusta College, which served the entire Bracken area until 1887 when the high school was moved into that spot. The college continued to serve the city until October 31, 1896.

Government
The city of Augusta is classified as a Class 4 city. Augusta is headed by the mayor and a City Council with six members and an attorney that preside at the meetings. After inauguration, the Mayor selects his Vice Mayor who remains in that post until the next mayor is elected. There is no limit to the number of terms either the Mayor or the City Council can serve.

The city also has a Police Department, Fire Department, County Ambulance Department, Maintenance Department, and a Water Treatment Department.

Industry
Augusta is home to a Berry Global manufacturing facility that makes plastic films.

Education
The public schools, Augusta Elementary School and Augusta High School, are managed by the Augusta Independent Schools school district. The district was founded in 1887. Lisa McCane is the 
Superintendent of Schools.

Saint Augustine School is a Parochial Catholic School that houses PK-8 grade. The school was founded in 1865 by the Sisters of Notre Dame.

Augusta mayors
 Mike Taylor  (2018–Present), won with the slimmest margin of victory in Augusta mayoral history. Ran primarily on a platform to build an 80's era arcade. 
 John Laycock (2009), named interim Mayor upon High's resignation
 Wendell High (2006–2009), the first mayor to win two nonconsecutive terms in office
 John Laycock (2002–2006), elected with 65% of the votes; first person to win a public office in the Commonwealth of Kentucky as a "write-in"
 Wendell High (1998–2002)
 Louis Habermehl, Jr. (1994–1998)
 Mike Bach (1990–1994) 
 Isaac Weldon (1986–1990)
 Thomas Appelman (1970–1986)

Notable people

 Henry Bidleman Bascom (1796–1850), religious circuit rider, U.S. Congressional Chaplain, professor at Augusta College, college president, editor
 George Clooney, graduated from Augusta High School
 Nick Clooney, American television journalist, anchorman, game show and American Movie Classics host
 Rosemary Clooney purchased a getaway home on the river in 1980.
 John Gregg Fee, alumnus of Augusta College, noted abolitionist in Kentucky
 Heather French, former Miss America, born in Augusta
 Don Galloway, actor from TV series Ironside
 William Henry Harrison stayed at General John Payne's home on Riverside Drive, on his way to be inaugurated.
 Buckner Stith Morris, second mayor of Chicago

See also
 List of cities and towns along the Ohio River
 Rosemary Clooney Museum, Riverside Drive, Augusta

References

External links
 City website
 Historical Images and Texts of Augusta, Kentucky
 Historical Augusta
 Kentucky Secretary of State Land Office

Cities in Bracken County, Kentucky
Kentucky populated places on the Ohio River
Populated places established in 1786
1786 establishments in Virginia 
Cities in Kentucky